Paraná Clube, commonly referred to as Paraná, is a Brazilian professional club based in Curitiba, Paraná founded on 19 December 1989. It competes in the Campeonato Paranaense Série Prata, the second tier of the Paraná state football league.

Established on December 19, 1989, in the Vila Capanema district, it is one of several Brazilian clubs called Tricolor da Vila ("tricolored of the town") by its fans because it has three team colors. Paraná's three colors are red, white and blue. Apart from football, other sports sponsored at the club are bowling, futsal, martial arts, tennis, volleyball and weight-lifting.

History
On December 19, 1989, Paraná Clube was founded by the merger of EC Pinheiros (three times winner of the state championship (1967 as Savóia FC Água Verde, 1984, 1987)), and Colorado EC (winner of one state championship (1980)). Rubens Minelli was hired as the club's first manager, and Emerson de Andrade was chosen as the director of football.

The club's first match was played on February 4, 1990, when Coritiba beat Paraná 1–0 at the Estádio Couto Pereira.

In 1991, two years after the club's foundation, Paraná won its first state championship. Later, Paraná would win five state championships in a row, from 1993 to 1997.

In 1992, the club won the Campeonato Brasileiro Série B, gaining the right to compete in the following year's Série A. After 8 years, Paraná Clube won another national championship. In 2000, Paraná beat AD São Caetano to win the Yellow Module of the João Havelange Cup. This cup replaced the Campeonato Brasileiro (all levels), which had been suspended for one year.

In 2003, Paraná Clube and L.A. Sports, which is a sports marketing company, started a partnership to help Paraná Clube keep its youth academy, and sign new players. In 2005, Paraná Clube created an investment fund to replace L.A. Sports, and, because of this, the partnership was not renewed.

On April 9, 2006, Paraná Clube won the Paraná State League for the 7th time after beating ADAP of Campo Mourão 3–0 in the Maringá and drawing 1–1 at Pinheirão Stadium. The attendance of the final match was 25,306 supporters.

Paraná Clube's stadium is the Estádio Durival Britto e Silva, also known as the Vila Capanema. It underwent a modernization in 2006, when more than 60 skyboxes were built, as well as new bathrooms and snack bars. The capacity of the "new" Vila Capanema rose to 20,083 spectators, and the inaugural match was held on September 20, 2006 when Paraná beat Fortaleza 2–0 in the Campeonato Brasileiro.

In 2007, Paraná played its first Copa Libertadores de América match. In the first stage, Paraná eliminated Cobreloa from Chile, winning the first leg 2–0 in Calama and drawing 1–1 in Curitiba. In the group stage, composed by Parana Clube, Flamengo, Union Maracaibo and Real Potosi, the club finished in second place. Paraná was eliminated in the Round of 16 by Libertad, of Paraguay.

After 10 years in the second division, Paraná gained access to the first division of the Brazilian Championship, defeating CRB 1-0 for the 37th round of Serie B 2017.

Stadiums

Paraná Clube's official stadium is Estádio Durival Britto e Silva, also known as Vila Capanema. They occasionally used to play at the Pinheirão. Vila Olímpica also belongs to Paraná Clube but it is only used for training:
 Estádio Durival Britto e Silva (Vila Capanema): capacity 20,000 spectators.
 Estádio Erton Coelho de Queiroz (Vila Olímpica): capacity 18,500 spectators.

Symbols

Crest
The club's logo has a stylized conifer cone format, in red, with a white contour, which contains an azure jay and a white pine. The club's name is written in blue, as is the word Brasil. The word Clube is written in white.

Flag
Paraná's flag is rectangular, divided in two equal parts vertically. The right side is red and the left side is blue.

Mascot
The mascot of Paraná Clube is an azure jay, a common bird in Paraná state. The bird is also the symbol of Paraná state.

Anthem
The Paraná Clube anthem was written by João Arnaldo and Sebastião Lima.

Colors
Paraná Clube's colors are red, blue and white. The red color was Colorado's main color, the blue color was Pinheiros' main color, and white was a color adopted by both teams.

Rivals
Their biggest rivals are from the same city: Atlético-PR and Coritiba.

Honours
Campeonato Brasileiro Série B:
 Winners: 1992

Copa João Havelange – Módulo Amarelo:
 Winners: 2000(1)

Campeonato Paranaense:
 Winners (7): 1991, 1993, 1994, 1995, 1996, 1997, 2006
 Runners-up (4): 1999, 2001, 2002, 2007

Campeonato Paranaense Série Prata:
 Winners: 2012

Copa Sul:
 Runners-up (1): 1999

Notes

1In 2000, Paraná Clube won the Yellow Module of the Copa João Havelange, equivalent to what would be Série B in that year. However, this title is not recognized by the CBF.

Current squad

Technical staff
Manager:  Allan Aal
Assistant manager:  Pedro Gama
Assistant manager:  Lúcio Flávio
Fitness coach:  Rodrigo Rezende
Assistant fitness coach:  Victor Annes
Goalkeeping coach:  Tedeschi

Managers

 Sebastião Lazaroni (1989)
 Rubens Minelli (1990)
 Otacílio Gonçalves (1991–92)
 Levir Culpi (1993)
 Rubens Minelli (1994–97)
 Vanderlei Luxemburgo (1995)
 Otacílio Gonçalves (1995–96)
 Sebastião Lazaroni (1996)
 Antônio Lopes (1996)
 Mário Juliato (1996)
 Cláudio Duarte (1997–98)
 Otacílio Gonçalves (1998–99)
 Abel Braga (1999–00)
 Geninho (2000)
 Caio Júnior (2002)
 Otacílio Gonçalves (2002–03)
 Cuca (2003)
 Adílson Batista (2003)
 Gilson Kleina (2004), (2006)
 Paulo Campos (2004–05)
 Lori Sandri (2005)
 Caio Júnior (2006)
 Zetti (2006–07)
 Pintado (2007)
 Gilson Kleina (2007)
 Lori Sandri (2007)
 Velloso (2009)
 Zetti (2009)
 Sérgio Soares (2009)
 Roberto Cavalo (2009)
 Marcelo Oliveira (2010)
 Roberto Cavalo (2010–11)
 Ricardo Pinto (2011)
 Guilherme Macuglia (2011)
 Ricardinho (2012)
 Toninho Cecílio (2012–13)
 Dado Cavalcanti (2013)
 Milton Mendes (2014)
 Ricardo Drubscky (2014)
 Claudinei Oliveira (2014)
 Ricardinho (2014)
 Nedo Xavier (2015)
 Fernando Diniz (2015)
 Claudinei Oliveira (2016)
 Marcelo Martelotte (2016)
 Roberto Fernandes (2016)
 Wagner Lopes (2017)
 Lisca (2017)
 Matheus Costa (2017)
 Wagner Lopes (2018)
 Rogério Micale (2018)
 Claudinei Oliveira (2018)
 Dado Cavalcanti (2018–19)
 Matheus Costa (2019–Present)

References

External links
Official team website
Torcida Fúria Independente
Torcida Virtual Paran@utas
Torcida da Argentina

 
Football clubs in Paraná (state)
Association football clubs established in 1989
Sport in Curitiba
1989 establishments in Brazil